Shi Ruwei (November 19, 1901 – January 18, 1983) was a Chinese physicist, who was a member of the Chinese Academy of Sciences.

References 

1901 births
1983 deaths
Members of the Chinese Academy of Sciences